Connected is an album by Norwegian guitarist Eivind Aarset.

John Kelman in his review states, "...the unique language that he has developed over the course of his previous two efforts, Electronique Noire and Light Extracts, would imply a more formidable technique at play that is simply so subtle that it is subsumed in the sheer musicality of the work. And that's exactly how it should be..."

Reception 
The review of the Norwegian newspaper Dagbladet awarded the album 5 stars (dice).

Track listing 
«Family Pictures 1» (5:11) Composer – Eivind Aarset, Erik Honoré & Jan Bang Electronics (dictaphone) – Jan Bang
«Electro Magnetic In E» (5:12) Bass clarinet – Hans Ulrik Composer – Eivind Aarset & Wetle Holte
«Connectic» (6:28)
«Feverish» (4:33) Effects (different noises) – Eivind Aarset & Wetle Holte Tenor saxophone, bass clarinet, effects (clef noise) – Hans Ulrik Composer – Eivind Aarset & Wetle Holte
«Silk Worm» (7:02) Composer – Eivind Aarset & Wetle Holte Keyboards – Wetle Holte
«Nagabo Tomora» (5:29) Bass – Marius Reksjø Percussion – Rune Arnesen Turntables – Pål "Strangefruit" Nyhus Vocals, oud – Dhafer Youssef
«Blue In E» (7:11) Bass – Eivind Aarset Computer (Fx) – Raymond Pellicer Drums, percussion – Anders Engen Electronics (drum machine Fx] – Wetle Holte
«Transmission» (5:44) Composer – Eivind Aarset & Raymond C. Pellicer Engineer (assistant, stable) – Leif Johansen Producer – Raymond C. Pellicer Programming, recording (Stable Studio), mixing – Raymond C. Pellicer
«Family Pictures 2» (4:48) Composer – Eivind Aarset, Erik Honore & Jan Bang
«Changing Waltz» (7:14)

Credits 
Artwork – Nicolai Schaanning Larsen
Composer – Eivind Aarset (tracks: 4, 6, 7, 10)
Double bass – Marius Reksjø (tracks: 2, 4, 5)
Drums – Wetle Holte (tracks: 2–6, 10)
Electronic drums – Wetle Holte (tracks: 4, 10)
Electric bass – Marius Reksjø (tracks: 3, 4, 10)
Electronics – Eivind Aarset (tracks: 1–3, 5–10)
Guitar – Eivind Aarset
Mastering – Thomas Eberger
Mixing – Reidar Skår (tracks: 2 to 7, 10)
Mixing, engineer – Erik Honoré (tracks: 1, 9)
Photography – John Nordahl
Producer – Eivind Aarset (tracks: 2 to 7, 10), Erik Honoré (tracks: 1, 9), Jan Bang (tracks: 1, 9)
Programming – Eivind Aarset (tracks: 2, 3, 5, 6, 10), Wetle Holte (tracks: 2, 3, 5)
Recording (7. Etage) – Reidar Skår (tracks: 2, 4, 7)
Recording (Audiopol) – Espen Gundersen (tracks: 4, 10)
Recording (Bugges Room) – Andy Mytteis (tracks: 2, 3, 5, 6)
Recording (Studio 1, Katakomben) – Eivind Aarset (tracks: 2, 3, 5–8, 10)
Sampler – Jan Bang (tracks: 1, 9)
Synthesizer (noise, Fx) – Marius Reksjø (tracks: 4, 5)

Notes 
Recorded at Punkt Studio (1,9), Bugges Room/7 Etg/Studio 1/Katakomben (2), Bugges Room/Katakomben (3,5,6), Audiopol/7 Etg (4), Katakomben/7. Etage (7), Stable Studio/Katakomben (8), Audiopol/Katakomben (10)
Mixed at Punkt Studio (1,9), 7. Etage (2,3,4,5,6,7,10), Eget Studio (8)
Mastered at Cutting Room

References

External links 
Eivind Aarset Trio - Silk Worm (2005) on YouTube

2004 albums
Eivind Aarset albums